Gottfried Bernhard Göz, also Goez, Goetz or Götz (baptized 10 August 1708, Welehrad - 23 November 1774, Augsburg) was a German Rococo painter and engraver.

Life 
His father was a locksmith at the Cistercian monastery in Welehrad. In 1718, he was enrolled at the Jesuit school in Ungarisch-Hradisch, where he studied rhetoric and grammar. After completing his course, he obtained a painting apprenticeship with Franz Gregor Ignaz Eckstein, who was restoring the monastery church. After four years, he probably became a wandering journeyman and settled in Augsburg around 1730. That city was a center for printing and publishing, as well as business and finance, so it is most likely that he learned engraving there to gain employment. He also apparently learned etching from Johann Georg Bergmüller.

He received his Master's certification in 1733 and was married shortly after. His wife died young and he married again in 1736. For many years, he was employed by the art and music publisher . From 1739, he also painted frescoes, including the chapel of the New Palace in Meersburg, the Dominican convent in Ostrach (Habsthal) and the Provost deanery in Konstanz.

In 1737, he went into the engraving business with the Klauber family. Five years later, he founded his own publishing and engraving business, inventing a typographical device that enabled him to provide colored copper engravings with painting-like shades. Two years later, he received the largely honorary title of Imperial Court Painter from Charles VII. He became a citizen of Augsburg and was appointed a Company Commander in the Civil Guard. In 1749, he began decorating a new sanctuary in Birnau, St.Cassian's church in Regensburg. His last frescoes were done from 1762 to 1766 in the parish church of Solothurn. A series of large oil paintings for the library hall at Admont Abbey were nearly destroyed, but several sculptures by Josef Stammel from drawings by Göz have been preserved.

References

Further reading 
 Eduard Isphording: Gottfried Bernhard Göz 1708-1774. Ölgemälde und Zeichnungen. 2 Bde. Weißenhorn: Konrad 1984.  and 
 Eduard Isphording: Gottfried Bernhard Göz 1708-1774. Ein Augsburger Historienmaler des Rokoko und seine Fresken. Weißenhorn: Konrad 1997.

External links 

 ArtNet: More works by Göz
 Augsburger Gedenktage: Timeline of Göz's life.
 Peter Stoll: Gottfried Bernhard Göz und die Seitenaltarbilder der Pfarrkirche von Tapfheim. Universitätsbibliothek, Augsburg 2008 
 Peter Stoll: Gottfried Bernhard Göz, Franz Anton Zeiller und die Rosenkranzspende von Scheer. Universitätsbibliothek, Augsburg 2011 
 Peter Stoll: Die Apostelfürsten von Gottfried Bernhard Göz in der Jesuitenkirche Hl. Kreuz in Landsberg am Lech. Universitätsbibliothek, Augsburg 2014 

1708 births
1774 deaths
18th-century German painters
18th-century German male artists
German male painters
German engravers